Massachusetts House of Representatives' 9th Hampden district in the United States is one of 160 legislative districts included in the lower house of the Massachusetts General Court. It covers part of Hampden County. Democrat José Tosado of Springfield has represented the district since 2015. Candidates for this district seat in the 2020 primary included Denise Hurst. Candidates Orlando Ramos and Robert Underwood have been selected to run in the general election in November 2020.

Locales represented
The district includes the following localities:
 part of Chicopee
 part of Springfield

The current district geographic boundary overlaps with those of the Massachusetts Senate's 1st Hampden and Hampshire district and  Hampden district.

Former locales
The district previously covered:
 Blandford, circa 1872 
 Chester, circa 1872 
 Montgomery, circa 1872 
 Russell, circa 1872 
 Tolland, circa 1872

Representatives
 Andrew J. Marvin, circa 1858 
 Elisha F. Miner, circa 1859 
 Henry Clark, circa 1888 
 Hugh J. Lacey, circa 1920 
 Wendell Phillips Chamberlain, circa 1951 
 Rudy Chmura, circa 1975 
 Christopher Asselin 2001–2005
 Sean Curran 2005–2015
 Jose Tosado, 2015–2021
 Orlando Ramos, 2021 present

See also
 List of Massachusetts House of Representatives elections
 Other Hampden County districts of the Massachusetts House of Representatives: 1st, 2nd, 3rd, 4th, 5th, 6th, 7th, 8th, 10th, 11th, 12th
 Hampden County districts of the Massachusett Senate: Berkshire, Hampshire, Franklin, and Hampden; Hampden; 1st Hampden and Hampshire; 2nd Hampden and Hampshire
 List of Massachusetts General Courts
 List of former districts of the Massachusetts House of Representatives

Images
Portraits of legislators

References

Further reading

External links
 Ballotpedia. Massachusetts House of Representatives Ninth Hampden District
  (State House district information based on U.S. Census Bureau's American Community Survey).
 League of Women Voters of Northampton Area

House
Government of Hampden County, Massachusetts